Sherman High School is a public high school in Moro, Oregon, United States.

Academics
In 2008, 92% of the school's seniors received a high school diploma. Of 26 students, 24 graduated, one dropped out, and one received a modified diploma.

References

Public high schools in Oregon
Schools in Sherman County, Oregon
Public middle schools in Oregon